Clyde is a village in northern Alberta, Canada. It is located north of Edmonton and east of Westlock,  near the junction of Highway 18 and Highway 2.

It was incorporated in 1914 and named after George D. Clyde, a local entrepreneur and the community's first postmaster.

Demographics 

In the 2016 Census of Population conducted by Statistics Canada, the Village of Clyde recorded a population of 430 living in 179 of its 198 total private dwellings, a  change from its 2011 population of 503.

Education
The village is within the Pembina Hills Public Schools, which formed in 1995 as a merger of three school districts.

See also 
List of communities in Alberta
List of villages in Alberta

References

External links 

1914 establishments in Alberta
Villages in Alberta
Westlock County